Watson Township is the name of some places in the U.S. state of Pennsylvania:
Watson Township, Lycoming County, Pennsylvania
Watson Township, Warren County, Pennsylvania

Pennsylvania township disambiguation pages